Zorba is a musical with a book by Joseph Stein, lyrics by Fred Ebb, and music by John Kander.  Adapted from the 1946 novel Zorba the Greek by Nikos Kazantzakis and the subsequent 1964 film of the same name, it focuses on the friendship that evolves between Zorba and Nikos, a young American who has inherited an abandoned mine on Crete, and their romantic relationships with a local widow and a French woman, respectively.

The musical premiered on Broadway in 1968 in a production directed by Harold Prince.  It was nominated for the Tony Award for Best Musical in a season that included Hair, Promises, Promises and 1776.  The last of these won the award. The original production ran for 305 performances, and a 1983 Broadway revival ran for 362 performances with a cast starring Anthony Quinn.

Productions
Original Broadway Production
The musical opened on Broadway on November 16, 1968, at the Imperial Theatre, where it ran for 305 performances and twelve previews. Directed by Harold Prince and choreographed by Ron Field, the cast included Herschel Bernardi, Maria Karnilova, Carmen Alvarez, John Cunningham, and Lorraine Serabian. Scenic design was by Boris Aronson, costume design was by Patricia Zipprodt, and lighting design was by Richard Pilbrow.

The production received several Tony Award nominations, winning the Tony Award for Best Scenic Design.

Music On Tour!
The musical was revised to be less "austere" and toured with John Raitt, and included a new song for him ("Bouboulina"). Chita Rivera played the role of "The Leader". Because reviews were not favorable, the show did not return to Broadway at that time.

The bus and truck tour featured Vivian Blaine ("Guys and Dolls") as Madam Hortense and Michael Kermoyan ("Camelot" & "Anya") in the title role, with Prince directing and choreography by Patricia Birch.

1976 (summer) Second National Tour
The second national tour started in Philadelphia in May 1976 and traveled all over the East Coast of the US and into Montreal, Canada (two weeks at Place des Arts after the Summer Olympics). The cast featured Theodore Bikel and Taina Elg. It was considered the best touring show of the "Straw Hat Circuit" that summer.

1983 Broadway Revival
The 1983 revival directed by Michael Cacoyannis and choreographed by Graciela Daniele opened on October 16, 1983, at the Broadway Theatre, where it ran for 362 performances and 14 previews. The cast included Anthony Quinn and Lila Kedrova (who had both starred in the film version, the latter winning an Oscar for her performance), in addition to Robert Westenberg, Debbie Shapiro, and Rob Marshall.

A film adaptation of the revival was in the works by film production company The Cannon Group, Inc., but the film was never materialized.

Other productions
Zorba has been produced professionally in Argentina (2003). Cast: Raúl Lavié, María Rosa Fugazot, Miguel Habud, Julia Zenko, Marcelo Trepat, Alejandro Viola (replaced by Gustavo Monje), Roberto Fiore, Rubén Ballester and Andrea Mango.

Concert production
Zorba was presented in the New York City Center Encores! staged concert series on May 6–10, 2015. The cast featured John Turturro, Zoe Wanamaker, and Marin Mazzie in the lead roles and direction by Walter Bobbie.

Synopsis
The story follows Zorba as he talks his way into traveling with Nikos, a young American who has inherited an abandoned mine on Crete. Eventually, Zorba falls in love with a French woman, Hortense. Meanwhile, Nikos falls in love with The Widow. Tragedy ensues when Zorba loses all of his money to a belly dancer. Further, a mentally unstable man, Pavli, commits suicide after witnessing Nikos and the Widow together. Then, a member of Pavli's family murders The Widow.

Design elements
Director Prince visited Crete and Mykonos, and the show's original design reflected the "peculiar color and light of the Greek Islands, the stark white of the...buildings as against the funereal black of the...clothes. Memorably 'Zorba' was presented in severe chiaroscuro."

Musical numbers

 Act I
 "Life Is" – Leader and Company
 "The First Time" – Zorba
 "The Top of the Hill" – Leader and Chorus
 "No Boom Boom" – Madame Hortense, Zorba, Nikos and Admirals
 "Vive La Difference" – Admirals and Dancers
 "Mine Song" § – Company
 "The Butterfly" – Nikos, Leader, The Widow and Chorus
 "Goodbye, Canavaro" – Madame Hortense and Zorba
 "Grandpapa" – Zorba, Leader and Chorus
 "Only Love" – Madame Hortense
 "The Bend of the Road" – Leader and Chorus
 "Only Love" (Reprise) – Leader

 Act II
 "Yassou" – Nikos, Zorba, Madame Hortense, Leader and Chorus
 "Woman" § – Zorba
 "Why Can't I Speak" / "That's a Beginning" – The Widow and Nikos
 "Easter Dance" § – Company
 "Miner's Dance" § – The Men
 "The Crow" – Leader and Women
 "Happy Birthday" – Madame Hortense
 "I Am Free" – Zorba
 "Life Is" (Reprise) – Leader and Company

§ = in 1983 revival

Reception
According to Sheldon Patinkin, the "material was too dark" and the "book too heavy" for a Broadway musical. "It includes a serious and often unpleasant commenting chorus, the death of the central female character, a suicide...and other depressing events. It didn't return its investment."

Clive Barnes in his review in The New York Times, wrote that "Prince was one of the very few creative producers on Broadway-a man who can put his own imprint on a show, and that imprint is planted all over Zorba like a sterling silver mark."

Awards and nominations

Original Broadway production

1983 Broadway revival

Characters
Alexis Zorba (Αλέξης Ζορμπάς), a fictionalized version of the mine worker George Zorbas (Γιώργης Ζορμπάς 1867–1942).

References

External links
Internet Broadway Database listing
plot and production listing at guidetomusicaltheatre.com
 2015 New York City Center interview with John Kander about Zorba

1968 musicals
Adaptations of works by Nikos Kazantzakis
Broadway musicals
Musicals based on films
Musicals based on novels
Musicals by Joseph Stein
Musicals by Kander and Ebb
Greece in fiction
Tony Award-winning musicals